The Little Brown Stein is a rivalry trophy awarded to the winner of the college football game between the University of Idaho Vandals and the University of Montana Grizzlies. The trophy is, as the name implies, a large stein mug with the results of all the games between the two 

The game was not played for fourteen seasons, from 2004 to 2017, and Montana retained the trophy. The series resumed 2018, when Idaho rejoined the Big Sky Conference for football.

History
Idaho and Montana first met in football  in 1903 and have played 88 times; the stein was introduced  in 1938 at the 25th meeting. Idaho has dominated the overall series  which also includes two Division I-AA playoff wins at home in the 1980s. Montana has had the upper hand since 1991, winning eleven of the last fourteen.  While Idaho was in Division I-A (FBS), from 1996 through 2017, the teams met only five times, with Montana winning the 

Conferences
Both were members of the old Pacific Coast Conference (the forerunner of today's Pac-12); Montana departed after the 1949 season, and the PCC disbanded in the summer of 1959. In most years, the loser of the game was last in the PCC standings. Montana was in the Skyline Conference from 1951 through the 1961 season.

The universities were two of the six charter members of the Big Sky Conference in 1963, (although Idaho remained an independent in football until 1965) and their final season as conference opponents was in 1995. While Montana has been in the Big Sky since its inception, Idaho changed its conference affiliation multiple times from 1995 to 2018:
 Idaho moved to the Big West for all sports in 1996, returning to Division I-A after 18 years in I-AA.
 After the 2000 season, the Big West dropped football. Idaho became a football-only member of the Sun Belt Conference in 2001 while remaining a full Big West member.
 Idaho joined the WAC for all sports in 2005 as part of a major NCAA conference realignment.
 After the WAC experienced a near-complete membership turnover in the early 2010s, it dropped football after the 2012 season. Idaho football was an FBS independent for one season in 2013.
 Idaho returned to the Big Sky in 2014 except for football, which rejoined the Sun Belt.
 Idaho dropped back to FCS in 2018 and resumed football membership in the Big Sky.

Results

 Years not played: 1904–13, 1918, 1943–44, 1954, 1963–64, 1996–98, 2004–17, 2020

Coaching records
Since 1945; Idaho led the first 29 meetings (through 1942) at ).

Idaho

Montana

 Last tie was in 1974 and the Big Sky enacted overtime for conference games in 1980; all Division I games went to overtime in 1996.
 Two games in 1982 and 1988; regular season at Montana and playoff (I-AA) at Idaho: home teams won all four games
 No games in 1954, 1963, 1964, 1996, 1997, 1998, 2004–2017, 2020

See also
 List of NCAA college football rivalry games

References

College football rivalry trophies in the United States
Idaho Vandals football
Montana Grizzlies football